Muskau Bend Landscape Park (Park Krajobrazowy Łuk Mużakowa) is a protected area (Landscape Park) in western Poland, established in 2001, covering an area of .

The Park lies within Lubusz Voivodeship, in Żary County (Łęknica, Gmina Brody, Gmina Przewóz, Gmina Trzebiel, Gmina Tuplice).

References 

Muskau Bend
Parks in Lubusz Voivodeship